W. floribunda may refer to:

 Waterhousea floribunda, an eastern Australian tree
 Wisteria floribunda, a pea native to Japan
 Woodfordia floribunda, a plant endemic to India